Igor Aleksandrovich Belyayev (born 30 August 1975) is a Russian professional football coach and a former player.

References

1975 births
Living people
Russian footballers
Association football midfielders
FC Avangard Kursk players
Russian football managers